Hot R&B/Hip-Hop Songs is a chart published by Billboard that ranks the top-performing songs in the United States in African-American-oriented musical genres; the chart has undergone various name changes since its launch in 1942 to reflect the evolution of such genres.  In 1978, it was published under the title Hot Soul Singles.  During that year, 22 different singles topped the chart, based on playlists submitted by radio stations and surveys of retail sales outlets.

Three acts which formed part of George Clinton's Parliament-Funkadelic collective, known for its eclectic mix of funk and psychedelic rock and its use of science fiction imagery, topped the chart in 1978.  In the issue of Billboard dated March 4, Parliament reached number one for the first time with "Flash Light".  After three weeks in the top spot the single was displaced by "Bootzilla" by Bootsy's Rubber Band, led by bass guitarist Bootsy Collins, one of the collective's principal members.  Finally, in September, Funkadelic gained its first chart-topper with "One Nation Under a Groove (Part 1)".  Both Parliament and Funkadelic featured largely the same musicians, with the different names reflecting differing styles of music.  "One Nation Under a Groove (Part 1)" was the year's longest-running chart-topper, spending six weeks at number one.  The track is regarded as a classic of the funk genre and was included on a list of 500 songs that shaped rock and roll compiled by the Rock and Roll Hall of Fame.

Several other acts gained the first soul number ones of their respective careers in 1978, beginning in the issue of Billboard dated January 7 when Con Funk Shun topped the chart with "Ffun".  In February, both Stargard and Enchantment reached number one for the first time with "Theme Song from 'Which Way Is Up'" and "It's You That I Need" respectively.  Both Johnny Mathis and Deniece Williams topped the chart for the first time when they collaborated on "Too Much, Too Little, Too Late" in April, and Quincy Jones, a successful producer, composer and band leader since the 1950s, gained his first chart-topping soul single in his own right with "Stuff Like That".  Later in the year, Teddy Pendergrass achieved his first solo number one after having been previously successful as the lead singer of Harold Melvin & the Blue Notes, and Rick James, A Taste of Honey and Foxy all reached the top of the chart for the first time.  The year's final chart-topper "Le Freak" was another debut number one, as Chic reached the top spot for the first time in the issue of Billboard dated December 2 and stayed there for the remainder of the year.  The song is regarded as a classic of the disco genre and was selected in 2018 for preservation in the National Recording Registry by the Library of Congress as being "culturally, historically, or artistically significant."

Chart history

See also

 List of Billboard Hot 100 number-one singles of 1978

References

1978 record charts
1978
1978 in American music